This is a list of the main career statistics of professional Australian tennis player Alicia Molik.

Major finals

Grand slam tournament finals

Women's doubles: 2 finals (2 titles)

Mixed doubles: 3 finals (3 runner-ups)

Olympic final

Singles: (bronze medal)

WTA Tier I & Premier Mandatory/Premier 5 finals

Singles: 1 final (1 title)

Doubles: 1 final (1 title)

WTA career finals

Singles: 9 (5-4)

Doubles: 16 (7-9)

ITF Finals

Singles (13–6)

Doubles (9–3)

Performance timelines

Singles

Doubles

Mixed doubles

Record against other top players

Head to head vs. top 10 ranked players

References

External links
 
 
 

Tennis career statistics